Haydon Bridge is a railway station on the Tyne Valley Line, which runs between  and  via . It is owned by Network Rail and managed by Northern Trains.

History
The Newcastle and Carlisle Railway was formed in 1829, and was opened in stages. In June 1838, the line was extended to Greenhead.

The nearby station at Fourstones closed in January 1967. In the same year, the station became an unstaffed halt, along with most of the other stations on the line that escaped the Beeching Axe. The original station building remains as a private residence.

The station's distinctive manually operated wooden level crossing gates were replaced by automated lifting barriers in January 2009, although they remain under the control of the adjacent North Eastern Railway signal box.

Facilities
The station has two platforms, both of which have a ticket machine (which accepts card or contactless payment only), seating, waiting shelter, next train audio and visual displays and an emergency help point. There is step-free access to both platforms by level crossing. There is a small car park at the station.

Haydon Bridge is part of the Northern Trains penalty fare network, meaning that a valid ticket or promise to pay notice is required prior to boarding the train.

Services 

Since the December 2021 timetable change, there is an hourly service (with some two-hourly gaps on Sunday) between Newcastle and Carlisle via . All services are operated by Northern Trains.

Rolling stock used: Class 156 Super Sprinter and Class 158 Express Sprinter

References

External links

Railway stations in Northumberland
DfT Category F2 stations
Former North Eastern Railway (UK) stations
Railway stations in Great Britain opened in 1836
1836 establishments in the United Kingdom
Northern franchise railway stations